A list of books and essays about Steven Soderbergh:

Soderbergh